Bernardo De Muro  (November 3, 1881 – 27 October 1955) was a Sardinian operatic tenor.

Biography

Bernardino de Muro was born on November 3, 1881, in Tempio Pausania, Sardinia, to Antonio Maria and Jeanne-Marie Demuro. His father was a small landowner. Bernardo's formal education ceased at primary school. Initially self-taught, he began singing in a café in Tempio. Moving to Rome, he participated in a competition for admission to the Conservatory of St. Cecilia in 1903. He studied under A. Sbriscia and Alfredo Martino. His operatic debut was on May 12, 1910, at the Teatro Costanzi in Rome, performing in Cavalleria rusticana by Mascagni. He received flattering reviews for this performance. In the next few years he performed in Madama Butterfly, L'Africaine, Carmen, and further performances of Cavalleria rusticana. Although he was long a star at La Scala, he was largely unknown to American audiences until he began to tour there. His continued career carried him to such places as the Solis in Montevideo, Uruguay in 1916, the Dal Verme in Milan (performing Mefistofele), the Hippodrome, St. Petersburg, Florida, in 1927, and The Dell Ofrecie Grand Opera Company of New York (performing Aida).

Later years
By 1935 De Muro was forced to cancel performances due to ill health. He became a successful businessman with a large cork factory in Milan. In his later years he taught voice in New York City, Sturgis, Michigan, and Rome.  He died in Rome in 1955. Recognized as Tempio's most famous son, his body was brought back to the place of his birth, and he was buried under a pyramid of his own design.

Singing style
His singing was reported to be resonant and clear with a robust tone, but pinched in the head-notes.

Partial discography

 Aida
  (His Master's Voice DA171; Victor 949) – recorded May 22, 1922
 Andrea Chénier
  (His Master's Voice DB 553; Victor 6387)  – recorded March 1, 1912
  (His Master's Voice DB 553; Victor 74376; Victor 6380)  – recorded March 1, 1912
 Carmen
 Ho nome Escamillo (with Roberto Janni) (His Master's Voice DB 554; Victor 6385)  – recorded March 30, 1914
  (His Master's Voice DB 549)  – recorded March 13, 1912
  (His Master's Voice 2-052173; Victor 6385)  – recorded May 19, 1917
 
  (His Master's Voice DA171; Victor 949) – recorded May 17, 1920
  (His Master's Voice DB 372; Victor 6422)  – recorded November 4, 1921
 Isabeau
  (with Valentina Bartolomasi) (His Master's Voice DB 556; Victor 6387)  – recorded March 8, 1912
  (Victor 6379)  – recorded March 7, 1912
  (His Master's Voice DB 558; Victor 6387)  – recorded March 7, 1912
  (with Valentina Bartolomasi) (His Master's Voice DB 556)  – recorded March 8, 1912
  (His Master's Voice DB 557; Victor 6379)  – recorded March 7, 1912
 Otello
  (Victor 6386)  – recorded March 30, 1914
  (His Master's Voice DB 559) 
  (His Master's Voice DB 560; Victor 6386)  – recorded March 30, 1914
  (His Master's Voice DB 559) 
 
  (with Ernesto Badini) (Victor 6410) 
  (with Ernesto Badini) (Victor 6410) 
  (with Maria Roggero) (His Master's Voice DB 644; Victor 6412)  – recorded April 28, 1917

Legacy

The Bernardo De Muro Musical Academy, founded in 2010, is located in Tempio Pausania, Sardinia.

The Bernardo De Muro Museum is housed within the Palazzo degli Scolopi, also located in Tempio Pausania, Sardinia.

References

External links
 
 

1881 births
1955 deaths
People from the Province of Sassari
Italian operatic tenors
RCA Victor artists
20th-century Italian male opera singers
Italian expatriates in the United States